Ani Samsonyan (born in Yerevan, then part of the Armenian SSR in 1990, February 10), is an Armenian politician and journalist, member of the National Assembly since was elected in 2018 election for Bright Armenia, assuming the office on 14 January 2019. She is the deputy chair of the Standing Committee on the Protection of Human Rights and Public Affairs. 

She is also a member of Inter parliamentary Committee on cooperation between the National Assembly of the Republic of Armenia and National Assembly of the Republic of Belarus. She has a membership in Parliamentary Assembly of the Organization for Security and Co-operation in Europe (PA OSCE). She is also engaged in a range of Friendship Groups of the National Assembly of the Republic of Armenia including Friendship Group Armenia-Austria, Friendship Group Armenia-Japan, Friendship Group Armenia - Latvia, Lithuania, Estonia, Friendship Group Armenia-Moldova, Friendship Group Armenia-Slovenia.

Education 
She got a degree in Journalism for the Armenian State Pedagogical University in 2011. 

Between 2011 and 2013 studied in the Department of International Relations at the International Center for Science and Education of the Armenian National Academy of Sciences.

Currently, she is studying in the Master’s Degree program of the Law Department of Public Administration Academy of the Republic of Armenia.

Career 
2010 - 2012  She has been a Scientific Associate at the H. Sharambeyan Center for Folk Art.

2012 - 2013  Journalist of “ArmNews” media TV company.

2012 - 2013   Author of the articles of the analytical website “Diplomat.am” (a series of articles, called “Information Wars and Campaign”).

2013 - 2014  Coordinator of the “ArmNews” press club.

2015   Founding member of the “Bright Armenia” initiative, then the “Bright Armenia” party, press secretary of the party.

2017- 2018   Deputy Chair of the Standing Committee of the Municipal Council of Yerevan on issues of urban planning and land use. Member of the “Way Out” faction.

As a result of the extraordinary election to the Yerevan City  Council held on 23 September 2018, was elected a member of the Council.

2018 - 2019  Member of the Standing Committee of the Municipal Council of Yerevan on issues of urban planning and land use. Member of the “Luys” faction.

December 9, 2018 - Elected Member of the National Assembly from the national electoral list of the “Bright Armenia” party.

References

1990 births
Living people
Politicians from Yerevan
Members of the National Assembly (Armenia)
Armenian journalists
21st-century Armenian women politicians
21st-century Armenian politicians
Armenian women journalists
21st-century journalists
Armenian State Pedagogical University alumni
Bright Armenia politicians